The Phantom 16, also called the Phantom 16', is an Italian catamaran sailing dinghy that was first built in 1988.

Production
The design has been built by Centro Nautico Adriatico in Italy since 1988 and remains in production.

Design
The manufacturer describes the boat's design as "a compromise, since it strikes the right balance between practicality and fun."

The Phantom 16 is a recreational sailboat, built predominantly of glassfibre, with a foam core. It has a stayed fractional rigged sloop rig. It has a rotating, watertight anodized aluminum mast and full battened Dacron mainsail. The hulls have raked stems, vertical transoms, transom-hung, kick-up rudders controlled by a tiller and retractable kick-up centreboards. The boat displaces  and can be fitted with a gennaker.

A two-piece mast is available to facilitate ground transport and storage.

The boat can be sailed with one to three people.

See also
List of sailing boat types
List of multihulls

Related development
Phantom 14 (catamaran)

Similar sailboats
DC‐14 Phantom - a boat with a similar name
Phantom (dinghy) - a 14.50 foot catboat with a similar name
Phantom 14 - a 14 foot Lateen-rigged sailboat with a similar name

References

External links

1980s sailboat type designs
Catamarans
Sailboat types built by Centro Nautico Adriatico